Isabella McCormack (sometimes known as Isabel, Isabell or Isabelle) was a sternwheel steamboat that operated in British Columbia on the Columbia River from 1908 to 1910.  This vessel should not be confused with others with similar names.

Design and Construction
Isabella McCormack was built at Golden, BC by Alexander Blakely for the Columbia River Lumber Company, and was intended to be a replacement for Ptarmigan.

Operations
Isabelle McCormack was placed on the Columbia River route that began at Golden and ran south, at least during high water, to Columbia Lake, the ultimate source of the Columbia River.  While the vessel was the fastest steamboat on the route, she was not a success.

Conversion to houseboat

In 1910 Isabella McCormack was converted into a floating houseboat and hotel.  Her engines were removed and installed in a new sternwheeler, [[Klahowya (sternwheeler)|'Klahowya]].  The vessel remained in houseboat use until 1914.

Notes

Further reading

 Faber, Jim, Steamer's Wake -- Voyaging down the old marine highways of Puget Sound, British Columbia, and the Columbia River, Enetai Press, Seattle, WA 1985 
 Timmen, Fritz, Blow for the Landing'', 75-78, 134, Caxton Printers, Caldwell, ID 1972 

Paddle steamers of British Columbia
Steamboats of the Columbia River
Columbia Valley
1908 ships